Faveria dasyptera is a species of moth in the family Pyralidae. It was described by Oswald Bertram Lower in 1903. It is found in the Australian state of Queensland.

References

Moths described in 1903
Phycitini
Moths of Australia